Antoine Dieu (ca. 1661–1727) was a French painter born in Paris. He was a son of Edouard Dieu, an engraver, who died in Paris in 1703. He was instructed by Lebrun, and painted historical subjects and portraits in the style of his master. The Duke of Burgundy before the King and the Marriage of the Duke of Burgundy are in the Museum at Versailles, but his best work is the portrait of Louis XIV. on his Throne, which was engraved by Nicolas Arnoult. Dieu was received at the Academy in 1722, and died in Paris in 1727. His brothers, Jean Dieu and Jean Baptiste Dieu, were engravers; the former was born about 1658, and died in Paris in 1714.

References

 

17th-century French painters
French male painters
18th-century French painters
1660s births
1727 deaths
Painters from Paris
18th-century French male artists